Chenar (also Romanized as Chenār; also known as Chenārleq) is a village in Darram Rural District, in the Central District of Tarom County, Zanjan Province, Iran. At the 2006 census, its population was 35, in 11 families.

References 

Populated places in Tarom County